Love in a Four Letter World is a Canadian softcore pornographic film, directed by John Sone and released in 1970. The film stars Michael Kane and Helen Whyte as Harry and Vera Haven, a wealthy couple whose lives are turned upside down when a group of hippies move into a commune in the house next door, drawing first their daughter Susan (Candy Greene), and then Helen herself, into their bohemian free love philosophy.

The cast also includes André Lawrence, Pierre Létourneau, Cayle Chernin and Monique Mercure.

The film was shot in the Crescent Street neighbourhood of Montreal. Producer Arthur Veronka claimed that "outside of Isabel or any Paul Almond production, Love in a Four Letter World is the first English-Canadian film that doesn't have that National Film Board-CBC look."

The film was entered in competition at the 22nd Canadian Film Awards in 1970, although Cinepix Film Properties, the film's studio, subsequently withdrew it and Here and Now (L'Initiation) from the competition after an article in Time implied that the Canadian Film Award jury was unsympathetic to the films' sexual content.

Critical response
The film received mixed reaction from critics. Martin Knelman of The Globe and Mail panned it, writing that "people smile over drinks and comment politely about the photography or the humor, but really there's no saving grace about Love in a Four Letter World. Even technically, it's dreadfully amateurish, and as for humor the word is in this case a euphemism for the hideous smirking that infests a movie when those involved aren't sure whether they can get away with playing the material straight or whether it would be better to try passing it off as camp," while Marilyn Beker of the Montreal Gazette wrote that it "is not a bad movie. In fact it is the kind of movie that tries too hard to be good and is constantly foiled. The sets are all polished and modern but the aging conceptualizers tried their hardest to figure out what the inside of a 'hippie pad' would look like and came out with a kind of Better Homes and Gardens version of how poor-but-arty people should live."

References

External links

1970 films
1970 drama films
Canadian drama films
Canadian sexploitation films
Canadian pornographic films
Films shot in Montreal
English-language Canadian films
1970s Canadian films